The Ghana Police Service (GPS) is the main law enforcement agency of Ghana. The service is under the control of the Ghanaian Ministry of the Interior, and employs over 30,000 officers across its 651 stations.

Organisational structure
The Ghana Police Service operates in twelve divisions: ten covering the ten regions of Ghana, one assigned specifically to the seaport and industrial hub of Tema, and the twelfth being the Railways, Ports and Harbours Division.
An additional division, the Marine Police Unit, exists to handle issues that arise from the country's offshore oil and gas industry.

The current head of the Ghana Police Service is Inspector General of Police (IGP) George Akuffo Dampare. For each of the regional police divisions, there is a Regional Commander who is in charge of all operational and administrative functions under his jurisdiction. In direct operational matters, the Regional Commander furthermore works in tandem with the Regional Operational Commander. For administrative functions, the Regional Commander is assisted by the Deputy Regional Commander and the Regional Crime Officer. The Deputy Inspector-General of Police is assisted by the Director-General of the Police Administration, and supervises the activities of the regional commanders of police.

Regional divisions
Apart from the National Police Headquarters, all the regional divisions have subdivisions under them. The aim of this is to decentralize the activities of the regional police force for more effective and flexible

Special units

There are, furthermore, specialized police units in all the regional divisions. The Regional Commander has oversight over these units. These units include:
 Arms and Ammunition
 Audit Offices
 Courts and Prosecution
 Crime Offices
 Domestic Violence and Victim Support
 Finance Offices
 Highway Patrol Unit
 Mobile Force (in eight regions)
 Motor Traffic and Transport Unit
 Police Training Schools (in five regions). 
 Public Affairs Directorate
 Rapid Deployment Force
 Mounted Squadron

Marine Police Unit
In April 2011, the Ghana Police Service set up a special Marine Police Unit (MPU). The unit has amongst its duties policing operations related to the country's oil and gas industry, and the handling of offenses contained in the Fisheries Act 2002 and Fisheries Regulations 2011.

The Marine Unit was inaugurated in Takoradi on 21 June 2013 by Vice President Kwesi Amissah-Arthur. The unit operates two 9-meter patrol boats (P1 & P2) and four 6.3-meter rigid inflatable boats (P3, P4, P5 & P6).

Mounted Squadron 
On August 12, 2021, the Ghana Police Service launched a horse patrol operations as part of the Mounted Squadron Unit of the Ghana Police Service. This unit would be running patrol services in some selected part of Accra, Ghana.

Other 
The Ghana Police Service has a women's football club called the Police Ladies Football Club, which was formed in 2007. The club plays in the Ghana Women’s Premier League, the first tier women's football league.

Inspector General of Police 
The current head of the Ghana Police Service is Inspector General of Police (IGP) George Akuffo Dampare.

Ghana Police Ranks
 Inspector General of Police
 Deputy Inspector General
 Commissioner
 Deputy Commissioner
 Assistant Commissioner
 Chief Superintendent
 Superintendent
 Deputy Superintendent
 Assistant Superintendent
 Chief Inspector
 Inspector
 Sergeant
 Corporal
 Lance Corporal
 Constable

Gallery

See also 
Law enforcement in Ghana  
Inspector General of Police of the Ghana Police Service
Ministry of Interior (Ghana)
Ghana Police Academy
Crime in Ghana
Police Ladies F.C.

References

Law enforcement agencies of Ghana
Law enforcement in Ghana
Ministries and Agencies of State of Ghana
1894 establishments in the British Empire